Philippe Di Francesco is a French-American mathematician, focusing in mathematical physics, physical combinatorics and integrable systems. He is senior researcher (Directeur de Recherche) at the Institute of Theoretical Physics (fr) in CEA Saclay, France, and is currently the Morris and Gertrude Fine Distinguished Professor of Mathematics at University of Illinois. He is also author of the book 'Conformal Field Theory'. He received his PhD in 1989, under Jean-Claude Le Guillou and Jean-Bernard Zuber, at the Pierre and Marie Curie University.

References

Year of birth missing (living people)
Living people
University of Illinois faculty
American mathematicians
French mathematicians